MD.45 was an American heavy metal/punk rock band formed as a side project by Megadeth guitarist/vocalist Dave Mustaine and Fear vocalist Lee Ving. Bassist Kelly LeMieux (of Fear) and drummer Jimmy DeGrasso (of Y&T and on a break from Alice Cooper, who later joined Megadeth) rounded out the band's lineup.

History 
The band's name was derived from Mustaine's initials backwards (MD), combined with 45 which is derived from converting Ving's backwards initials (VL) to their numerical value in Roman numerals which is 45.

The band released only one album, 1996's The Craving.

Remixing controversy 
In 2004, while remixing the Megadeth catalog, Mustaine omitted all vocals and harmonica parts from Ving. Instead, Mustaine himself recorded the vocals, and played guitar where the harmonica should've been. In this 2011 autobiography, Mustaine said:

In 2020, Ving publicly manifested his disapproval, saying in a podcast that he was never consulted about the changes, and Mustaine didn't contact him in any way. The remastered version was released by Capitol Records.

Lineup 
Lee Ving – vocals, harmonica (original issue)
Dave Mustaine – guitar (on both issues), vocals (on remastered issue)
Kelly LeMieux – bass
Jimmy DeGrasso – drums

Other
Michael Kaye – guitar/backline technician
Billy Moss – studio engineer/vintage recorders

Discography

References 

Megadeth
American heavy metal musical groups